This page summarizes projects that propose to bring more than  of new liquid fuel capacity to market, with the first production of fuel beginning in 2013.  This is part of the Wikipedia summary of oil megaprojects.

Quick links to other years

Detailed list of projects for 2013 
Terminology
 Year startup: year of first oil; specific date if available
 Operator: company undertaking the project
 Area: onshore (LAND), offshore (OFF), offshore deep water (ODW), tar sands (TAR)
 Type: liquid category (i.e. natural gas liquids, natural gas condensate, crude oil)
 Grade: oil quality (light, medium, heavy, sour) or API gravity
 2P resvs: 2P (proven + probable) oil reserves in giga barrels (Gb)
 GOR: ratio of produced gas to produced oil, commonly abbreviated GOR
 Peak year: year of the production plateau/peak
 Peak: maximum production expected (thousand barrels/day)
 Discovery: year of discovery
 Capital investment: expected capital cost; FID (Final Investment Decision); if no FID, then normally no project development contracts can be awarded.  For many projects, a FEED stage (Front End Engineering Design) precedes the FID.
 Notes: comments about the project (footnotes)
 Ref.: sources

References

2013
Oil fields
Proposed energy projects
Projects established in 2013
2013 in the environment
2013 in technology